Robert Holmes Thomson  (born 1947), known as R. H. Thomson, is a Canadian television, film, and stage actor. With a career spanning five decades he remains a regular presence on Canadian movie screens and television. He has received numerous awards for his contributions to the arts, and to war veterans.

Life and career
Thomson was born on September 24, 1947, in Richmond Hill, Ontario. He studied at the University of Toronto and the National Theatre School.

His own play The Lost Boys was staged at the Great Canadian Theatre Company in March 2000 and at Canadian Stage in February 2002. He has also hosted programming for CBC Radio and CBC Television. Thomson has portrayed a number of historical figures including Samuel Lount, Edsel Ford, Frederick Banting, Duncan Campbell Scott, Mitchell Sharp, and James Cross.

In 2010, he was appointed a Member of the Order of Canada. In May 2015 Thomson received a Governor General's Performing Arts Award for Lifetime Artistic Achievement. Eric Peterson performed in his honour at the gala celebrating the laureates at the National Arts Centre.

Personal life

Thomson is married with two sons.<ref>At home with actor R.H. Thomson. Toronto Star, November 22, 2008.</ref>

Thomson has had a long-standing interest in Canada's military and war veterans. In 1995 he narrated a 3-part documentary series about Canada's involvement in international conflicts. On the 90th anniversary of the Battle of Vimy Ridge, in which nearly 3,600 Canadians died, he co-created, with Marin Conboy, a commemoration in which the name of each fallen soldier was projected onto the National War Memorial. The following year in 2009, he and Conboy undertook an ambitious project to project the names of the more than 68,000 Canadians who died in World War I onto famous monuments across the country. Projections occurred during the night. In 2010, the Government of Canada honoured Thomson for this effort with a Minister of Veterans Affairs Commendation.

 Filmography 
Film

Television

Awards

Wins
1989 : Gemini Award, for Glory Enough for All1983 : Gemini Award, for If You Could See What I Hear2015:  Governor General's Performing Arts Award for Lifetime Artistic Achievement (Theatre)
2018 : Canadian Screen Award, for Best Supporting Actor in a Drama Anne with an ENominations
1982 : Genie Award, for Ticket to Heaven1986 : Genie Award, for Samuel Lount1986 : Gemini Award, for Canada's Sweetheart: The Saga of Hal C. Banks1987 : Gemini Award, for Screen Two1987 : Gemini Award, for Ford: The Man and the Machine1988 : Gemini Award, for And Then You Die1993 : Genie Award, for The Lotus Eaters1994 : Gemini Award, for Road to Avonlea2008 : Gemini Award, for The Englishman's Boy''

References

External links
 

1947 births
Living people
Canadian male film actors
Canadian male television actors
Canadian male voice actors
Best Supporting Actor Genie and Canadian Screen Award winners
Members of the Order of Canada
People from Richmond Hill, Ontario
University of Toronto alumni
Dora Mavor Moore Award winners
Male actors from Ontario
Governor General's Performing Arts Award winners
Best Supporting Actor in a Drama Series Canadian Screen Award winners